Victoria College of Music and Drama is an examinations board based in London, United Kingdom, which offers independent graded exams, medals and diplomas in music, speech and drama in the UK and selected other countries such as the Republic of Ireland, Malta and Sri Lanka. 

Formed in 1890 as Victoria College of Music and incorporated in 1891, the College is now solely an examining body and no longer operates a full-time teaching institution, though in its early years offered many of the services of a full conservatoire. Throughout the early and mid-twentieth century the College offered correspondence courses in theory and written subjects, maintained a network of teachers with whom tuition could be arranged both in London and local centres, and arranged summer schools and other residential courses in various disciplines. However following the Second World War the College has focused upon its work in the examining field and developing syllabuses as required.

From its founding the college has had a mission based upon the development of the candidate. As a result, the college examines in a range of subjects, including many not offered by other boards such as contrabassoon, mandolin and ukulele, as well as a  range of speech and drama subjects. In particular the college has a policy of introducing new subjects where requested to meet the needs of teachers and to match new innovations in educational policy. Examples include the new options for large ensembles and group examination within ocarina playing to take into account the current UK government policy on whole class instrumental and vocal teaching.

Subjects
As a result of its broad remit, Victoria College of Music and Drama offers a range of subjects including all traditional musical disciplines, as well as more unusual ones including contrabassoon, ukulele, self-accompanied singing and mandolin. The board was a pioneer in the examination of electronic organ and still maintains a full syllabus for this instrument, as well as being the first board to offer examinations in electronic keyboard to diploma level. However the activities of the college are not confined to the sphere of music and it is very active in the field of speech and drama, offering a range of examinations in subjects as diverse as Business Speaking, Acting, Speech, Bible Reading and Drama Production. Many of these fields are available in the full range of examinations, diplomas and medals.

Examinations and Diplomas
The College has a full range of examinations, with special emphasis on encouraging young beginners. This has resulted in the four introductory grades available for most subjects at First Steps, Preliminary, Preparatory and Advanced Preparatory. These examinations are aimed at players within the first twelve months of playing an instrument. Following on from these introductory grades are the standard grades 1 to 8, available in music subjects and speech and drama.

Parallel to the graded examinations is a series of medals that take the form of recitals with theory questions drawing from the same repertoire but without scales, arpeggios or musicianship tests It is also available as an additional qualification for those who take the graded exams. Medals have been awarded from the earliest years of the College's existence. The medal examinations are:
Junior Bronze Medal
Junior Silver Medal
Bronze Medal
Silver Medal
Gold Medal
Platinum Medal

In some cases, the College's requirements differ from those of other exam boards. At least grade IV theory of music is required for grade 8 in any practical examination. There is a grade V minimum requirement for the diploma (see below), and for an Associate diploma, grade VI for Licentiate diploma but no theory requirement for a Fellowship diploma, as entrants already hold Licenitate or have been granted direct entry by virtue of other prior learning.  For some grades and diplomas, other means of showing the required theory can be used. For example for grade 8 a GCSE C grade or equivalent (e.g. a BTEC Level 2 pass, merit or distinction). For a candidate who has not taken the theory or produced the equivalent, the College will hold the certificate and award until produced or exemption is granted.

Diplomas
The College has a full system of diploma examinations, available in most fields. Until 2012 a Pre-Diploma Certificate existed and wadm the followed by the first full diploma, the Diploma of Victoria College of Music and Drama (DipVCM), which carries with it the right to post-nominal letters and reduced academic dress. The certificate was withdrawn from all subjects to come into line with other awarding bodies at the higher levels. There then follows the three standard diplomas of Associate (AVCM), Licentiate (LVCM) and Fellow (FVCM) which all carry post-nominal letters and academic dress. These are available in all fields as performers' or teachers' diplomas, as well as by composition, conducting, research or theory. There also exists the award of Certificated Teacher (CT, VCM) which is an award based upon teaching ability and the Honorary Life Membership (HonVCM) for those who have given many years service to the College as a teacher, local secretary, examiner, etc. Both these carry post-nominal letters. FVCM is also awarded as an honorary award from time to time for distinguished service to the College. Some diplomas also carry the suffix 'Ed' for in Education (e.g. AVCMEd). However, teaching and education diplomas do not confer UK Qualified Teacher Status, rather they show that the examiner would recommend them to a prospective student. 

The College of Violinists was founded in 1890 and became an administrative division of Victoria College of Music in 1962. In addition the diplomas noted above, the diplomas of Associate of the College of Violinists (ACV) and Licentiate of the College of Violinists (LCV) remain available through Victoria College Examinations as performance diplomas for string players, while Fellow of the College of Violinists (FCV) is awarded purely for services to the arts.

Marking 
 
Last revised in 2012

Solo one= Out of 20
 
Solo two= Out of 20
 
Solo three= Out of 20
 
Scales & Arpeggios= Out of 10
 
Questions= Out of 10
 
Sight Reading= Out of 10
 
Aural tests/ Own composition= Out of 10
 
Total= 100
 
Unsuccessful=<65
 
Pass= 65-79
 
Merit= 80-89
 
Distinction= 90-100

London Music Press
London Music Press is the publishing arm of the College and was set up in the early 20th century to provide an inexpensive means of supplying music for Victoria College examinations. New editions of classic repertoire are published, as are new arrangements for different instruments and new contemporary music written especially for the College’s examinations. A collaboration with a separately run vcmpublications.co.uk saw a new line of publications including tutor books for various subjects, as well as new exam sheets for most disciplines.

External links
 Official website

 

Qualification awarding bodies in the United Kingdom